The men's 15 km mass start competition of the 2015 Winter Universiade was held at the Sporting Centre FIS Štrbské Pleso on January 31.

Results

References 

Men's 15km